Publications reporting the factual situation of human rights in North Korea (DPRK) are the basis upon which policies are shaped and society mobilized. This article includes those fact-finding publications issued by the United Nations, governments, and non-governmental organizations (NGOs)/ civil society entities.

This article focuses on listing fact-finding reports, which distinguish themselves from other publications such as pamphlets, news articles, books, or journal articles, in that they are meant to aggregate information from multiple sources and provide a balanced, overall view of the topic covered for the non-commercial purpose of informing the general public and policy makers. These reports tend to rely more on the credibility of their publishing institutions than on their individual authors. Fact-finding reports are also distinct from policy briefs as the latter ground their analysis and recommendations on the facts laid out in the former. The inclusion is based on the notability (and not the concurrence to any particular view) of the publishing institutions to the inquiry and deliberations on the situation in North Korea.

This list lays out the evolution of the reporting efforts, with a first wave of reports by human rights NGOs just describing the general characteristics of the regime, followed by another wave of civil society and governmental reports with some more details, then prompting the United Nations to also exercise greater scrutiny and pursue its own investigations.

The vast majority of reports (except those published by the DPRK itself, also included in this article) point to a very grave situation, with human rights systematically violated by the North Korean government.

Efforts to continue to investigate and document the situation of human rights in the DPRK are on-going, given that there are no indications of substantial improvements in the regime's policies, and despite the continued isolation of the regime that limits outside investigators' access to the country and to its general population.

Introduction and overview

Historical context

Korea had for centuries been a high-ranking tributary state within the Imperial Chinese tributary system, until in the late 19th century Japan began to assert greater control over the Korean peninsula, culminating in its annexation in 1910. It remained a colony of Japan, until Japan lost World War II in 1945.

At the end of WWII, with Japan stripped of its colonial territories, the Korean peninsula became a United Nations trusteeship, with the northern half administered by the Soviet Union, and the southern half administered by the United States. The ultimate stated plan was to allow  Korea as a whole to become again a united and independent country. Disagreements among the parties on how and when to implement the united self-rule led to the two territories establishing their own separate and rival governments. The Korean War (1950-1953) was the last attempt to reunify the peninsula by force, but it ended in stalemate and it entrenched two very different regimes.

Within the Soviet and American spheres respectively, the North became a Stalinist totalitarian regime uninterruptedly led by the Kim family, and the South became a capitalist society that until 1987 included short periods of unstable democracy as well as longer periods of authoritarian rule, including over 25 years of right-wing military rule.

Propped by their allies, North and South experienced rapid economic growth after the Korean War, but in the 1970s the North's growth faltered while the South's accelerated.

While South Korea had a period of military autocracy, mass mobilizations of its citizens forced its end in 1987. This led to the modern South Korea being a young, more stable democracy with a prosperous free market economy. Meanwhile, North Korea's totalitarian regime kept a stronger grip on its society, which was never able to mobilize to demand reforms. Its command economy stagnated in the 1970s, and after the disintegration of the Soviet Union it spiralled into crisis in the 1990s, leading to a massive famine. North Korea remains to this day as one of the most isolated countries in the world, with a struggling economy, within an isolationist, militaristic, and totalitarian regime.

Chronology and major themes

The reporting of human rights in the DPRK follows the progression of the modern movement of human rights, which from the 1970s civil society and governmental efforts made violations more visible to the general public and in international politics.

Given the opacity of the DPRK's regime, especially before the 1990s, little was known about the situation of human rights. The few reports that were issued at that time made note of the lack of concrete information, mostly only being able to describe the general characteristics of the country's political system. Amnesty International, founded in 1961, began to issue some basic reports on the DPRK in 1977. In 1979 the US's Department of State also began to cover the DPRK in its Country Reports on Human Rights Practices.

With the dissolution of the Soviet Union, and the subsequent North Korean famine of the 1990s, a higher number of individuals began to flee the country, and more first-person accounts began to be collected by human rights organizations. That was also followed in the early 2000s by greater availability of satellite imagery. South Korea, having itself transitioned from a military dictatorship to a democracy in the late 1980s, began to publish reports in 1996 through its governmental think tank Korea Institute for National Unification. In the late 1990s and  2000s several NGOs specialized on North Korea emerged and began to publish their own research: Citizens' Alliance for North Korean Human Rights (1996), Committee for Human Rights in North Korea (2001), Database Center for North Korean Human Rights (2003), People for Successful Corean Reunification (2006). Around the same time some other world-wide human rights organizations such as Human Rights Watch and Christian Solidarity Worldwide also began to publish reports on the DPRK.

As reports from NGOs and governments began to reveal more details on the human rights situation in the DPRK during the 1990s and 2000s, these concerns were elevated to the United Nations, where various UN bodies and parties also began to express a growing concern on the situation and opacity of the regime. The mounting evidence being collected and published by governments and civil society led in 2004 to the establishment of the mandate for the Special Rapporteur on the situation of human rights in the DPRK, issuing reports annually.

The growing amount of information, and the grave situation it increasingly revealed, led the United Nations General Assembly and the UN Human Rights Council (HRC) to repeatedly pass resolutions officially expressing their concerns and urging the DPRK's government to change its ways.

Ten years later, further joint efforts by the UN Special Rapporteur, governments, and NGOs led to the establishment of a special one-time investigation unprecedented in depth and breadth commissioned by the Human Rights Council, with a landmark report published in 2014. It was deemed the most authoritative report up to that point. The report unequivocally concluded that the DPRK regime committed gross and systematic violations of human rights including freedom of thought, expression and religion; freedom from discrimination; freedom of movement and residence; and the right to food, as well as crimes against humanity entailing "extermination, murder, enslavement, torture, imprisonment, rape, forced abortions and other sexual violence, persecution on political, religious, racial and gender grounds, the forcible transfer of populations, the enforced disappearance of persons and the inhumane act of knowingly causing prolonged starvation".

The UN's fact-finding process continues to yield periodical reports, which greatly rely on and are underpinned by the also on-going research and publishing conducted by NGOs and governmental agencies.

Increased awareness of human rights abuses has led to efforts in shaping policy and pressuring the North Korean regime. However the pursuit for the improvement of human rights in the DPRK has had to contend with the efforts of preventing a nuclear weapons escalation. Further, the isolationist and totalitarian nature of the regime has also meant that information and freedom of movement of its population as well as that of foreigners is still tightly controlled, making extremely challenging to document abuses on the ground, including having access to imagery (other than satellite imagery) that could inspire greater action.

United Nations

The United Nations has issued four main kinds of reports on the human rights of North Korea.

The first are a series of documents intended to be recommendations from Treaty-based bodies, which are issued by those bodies to each country that is party to it (in contrast to charter-based bodies, which all UN members are part of). These treaty-based bodies that North Korea has decided to be a party to include the Convention on the Elimination of All Forms of Discrimination Against Women, Committee on the Rights of the Child, and International Covenant on Civil and Political Rights. The first document of this kind was issued in 1998 (Convention on the Rights of the Child); the second was in 2001 (International Covenant on Civil and Political Rights), after a 17-year delay in North Korea submitting the required information to the committee.

Prompted by growing evidence provided by human rights NGOs, during the 1990s and 2000s various UN bodies and parties expressed greater concern on the situation of human rights in North Korea and the opacity of the country's government. That led to another series of reports that were started by the UN Commission on Human Rights (the predecessor of the UN Human Rights Council), which established the mandate for the Special Rapporteur on the situation of human rights in the DPRK in 2004, issuing reports annually. They are issued in detail to the Human Rights Council, and in a more condensed form to the General Assembly.

The United Nations also conducts a Universal Periodic Review (every 3 or 4 years, in which all UN members are subject to a review on their human rights practices), with the first report on North Korea issued in 2010.

Finally, the most notable one was the 2014 Report of the Commission of Inquiry on Human Rights in the DPRK, considered a landmark document resulting from a special in-depth, one-time investigation commissioned by the Human Rights Council, It was deemed the most authoritative report up to that point.

2014 Commission of inquiry

 (Archived here)
 (Archived here)

Universal Periodic Review

Special Rapporteur
Special Rapporteur annual reports to the Human Rights Council

Other reports

Governmental reports

North Korea
North Korea published a report on its own human rights situation, as a rebuttal to the 2014 United Nations report. It has also submitted reports to the United Nations.

 (also archived here, and here)

Reports to the United Nations

South Korea

The Korea Institute for National Unification (KINU; formerly the Research Institute for National Unification) opened the Center for North Korean Human Rights in 1994 to collect and manage systematically all source materials and objective data concerning North Korean human rights; and from 1996, KINU has been publishing every year the ‘White Paper on Human Rights in North Korea’ in Korean and in English. Other reports, including reports by the U.S. government, use South Korea KINU's reports as part of their sources. Another South Korean governmental institution publishing research on human rights in the DPRK is the National Human Rights Commission of Korea (NHRCK).

Annual general reports (Korea Institute for National Unification)

Thematic reports and other (KINU and NHRCK)

United States

The United States government, through its Department of State's (DOS) Bureau of Democracy, Human Rights, and Labor has published annually Country Reports on Human Rights Practices, that beginning in 1979 included North Korea. Also, two different bodies within the U.S. government have published reports on religious freedom: the Department of State (since 2001), and U.S. Commission on International Religious Freedom (USCRIF; since 2003). Finally, the DOS' Office to Monitor and Combat Trafficking in Persons also publishes  Trafficking in Persons Reports (TIP) that include some coverage of North Korea. The TIP reports series began in 2001, following the passing of the Victims of Trafficking and Violence Protection Act of 2000, with North Korea beginning to be briefly covered starting in the 2003 report, and more fully covered beginning in 2005.

The Country Reports on Human Rights Practices issued by the DOS noted every year the difficulty of having detailed an up-to-date information, and instead relying on sparse information collected over several years. This was especially the case in the during the 1970s and 80s, and began to change in the 1990s with more witness accounts, while continuing to note a lack of more detailed and more timely information. As more reports became available, the DOS and USCRIF reports have frequently cited reports from the United Nations, South Korea's Korea Institute for National Unification (starting in 1996), nonprofits (especially the Committee for Human Rights in North Korea and Data Center for North Korean Human Rights, since their establishment in the 2000s), and from the press.

Annual general reports

Annual general reports 2000–present

Religious freedom reports (Department of State)

Religious freedom reports (Commission on International Religious Freedom)

Trafficking in Persons Reports

Human rights organizations specialized on North Korea (based in South Korea)

Citizens' Alliance for North Korean Human Rights
The Citizens' Alliance for North Korean Human Rights (NKHR; South Korea-based nonprofit founded in 1996) works in researching and disseminating information about the human rights violations in North Korea. It also runs assistance programs for North Korean defectors.

Database Center for North Korean Human Rights
The Database Center for North Korean Human Rights (NKDB; South Korea-based nonprofit founded in 2003) specializes in collecting and analyzing and maintaining a database of human rights abuses, which as of 2017 included the accounts of over 40,000 individuals and 60,000 cases of human rights violations.

Annual general reports

Religious freedom

Other thematic reports

Other

Human rights organizations specialized on North Korea (based outside South Korea)

Committee for Human Rights in North Korea (U.S.-based)

The Committee for Human Rights in North Korea (HRNK; U.S.-based non-profit established in 2001) is known for its original research based on its adept use of satellite imagery, defector accounts, and even information coming directly from inside the country. Its published research has been relied upon as sources in reports issued by the United Nations and governments. HRNK has issued three types of reports: reports analyzing the situation on prison camps, reports on other human rights issues in the country, and reports on North Korea's leadership and institutions, as well as policy briefings addressed at the international community. The first two types of reports are listed here.

Reports on prison camps

Thematic reports

Other
(part 2, appendices)

Human rights organizations

Amnesty International
Amnesty International (AI; based in the United Kingdom, established in 1961) annual report The state of the world's human rights initially included a brief mention of most countries, growing in later years to devoting 1-2 pages to the analysis of the situation of human rights in each country, including North Korea in 1977. Through the 1970s, 1980s the organization noted that its ability to report on human rights in the country was severely hampered by the opacity of the regime, and only being able to recount some scant reports. This began to change in the 1990s when some more information became available. Also since that  point AI has also issued other stand-alone reports specific to human rights issues in North Korea.

Annual general reports

Annual general reports 2000–present

Thematic reports

Submissions to the United Nations

Human Rights Watch
Human Rights Watch publishes annually a World Report. Below are listed the sections of those annual reports that focus on the situation in North Korea. HRW has produced world reports since 1989 covering a limited number of countries, and it began to devote a section to the DPRK in 2004.

Annual general reports

Thematic reports

Other

Reports by other kinds of organizations

Bar associations

See also

Human rights in North Korea
Report of the Commission of Inquiry on Human Rights in the Democratic People's Republic of Korea
North Korean studies
Media coverage of North Korea
Books about North Korea (category)

Notes

Historical context sources

References

External links
United Nations links
UN Human Rights Office of the High Commissioner - Human rights by country: DPRK 
UN Human Rights Office of the High Commissioner - Database of documents on the DPRK 
UN Human Rights Office (Seoul)
UN Committee on Economic, Social and Cultural Rights (CESCR) - DPRK
Refworld - database of documents on the DPRK
UN Universal Period Review - DPRK
Governmental links
Korean Institute for National Unification - publications (South Korea)
Serial archive listings for Country Reports on Human Rights Practices 1977-present (U.S.) (University of Pennsylvania)
Country Reports on Human Rights Practices 1999-present (U.S.)
Traffic in Persons report list (U.S.)
Religious freedom reports (U.S.)
United States Commission on International Religious Freedom - North Korea
Non-governmental organizations links
The Committee for Human Rights in North Korea - publications
Amnesty International - Report on North Korea (recent years)
Serial archive listings for Amnesty International Annual Report 1962-present (by University of Pennsylvania)
Human Rights Watch - reports on North Korea
Database Center for North Korean Human Rights
Korea Future Initiative - reports
Anti-slavery International
Christian Solidarity Worldwide - Media Centre
People for Successful Corean Reunification - UN reports

Lists of publications
Human rights in North Korea